Bohdan Andrzejewski (born 15 January 1942) is a Polish fencer. He won a bronze medal in the team épée event at the 1968 Summer Olympics.

He was a world champion in épée at the Senior World Championships in Havana, Cuba in 1969.

References

1942 births
Fencers at the 1964 Summer Olympics
Fencers at the 1968 Summer Olympics
Fencers at the 1972 Summer Olympics
Living people
Medalists at the 1968 Summer Olympics
Olympic bronze medalists for Poland
Olympic fencers of Poland
Olympic medalists in fencing
Polish male fencers
Sportspeople from Kielce
20th-century Polish people